The Sour Puss is a 1940 Warner Bros. Looney Tunes cartoon directed by Bob Clampett. The short was released on November 2, 1940, and stars Porky Pig.

Plot
Porky is sitting on a rocking chair reading the newspaper while his pet cat sleeps nearby. He spots an ad for fishing season and tells his cat about it but first he makes him guess what they'll be having for dinner tomorrow; the cat asks if it's chicken and Porky replies that it isn't, making the cat disappointed. Porky then tells the cat that it's fish; hearing this, the cat parades around the house, bouncing off the walls and pauses to pull a mouse out of its hole and kisses it. Porky's canary sees this and declares "Well, now I've seen everything!". He pulls out a gun and commits suicide–allegedly this is the first cartoon to feature this popular trope. That night, the cat is having trouble sleeping so he takes a bottle of sleeping pills which contains a mallet–he hits himself with it, knocking himself out.

The next day, they go down to the fishing hole and spot a flying fish that is literally flying out of the pond. The cat knocks out the fish with a swipe of his claws and picks it up; Porky says, "Well, Pussy, it looks like we're having fish for di-di-di-supper!" The fish regains consciousness and says "That's what you think, chum!", while laughing hysterically and honking the cat's nose. The flying fish skids through the water, laughing all the way, and dives back into the lake. The cat looks for the fish while sticking his face underwater; the fish punches the cat's nose like a punching bag and, climbing on the cat's back and playing his tail like a cello, he taunts the cat and knocks him into the water.

The fish torments Porky and makes him think that he caught him, but he goes up and down like a yo-yo on Porky's fishing line. Meanwhile, the cat recovers, and the fish tells the audience, "Hey, gang, get a load of this!". The fish dives into the water sideways, making his fin look like a shark's; Porky tells the cat to look out, but the cat sees this and grabs the fish by the fin, only to realize that he is now holding a real shark. The cat and Porky run off into the distance; the shark turns to the audience and says, "pussy cats is de cwaziest peoples!" The shark laughs while the cartoon irises out.

Home media
This cartoon is available on Looney Tunes Golden Collection: Volume 4 and Porky Pig 101.

References

External links

1940 animated films
1940 films
1940s animated short films
Looney Tunes shorts
Warner Bros. Cartoons animated short films
Films directed by Bob Clampett
Films about fishing
Porky Pig films
1940s Warner Bros. animated short films